Culmington is a civil parish in Shropshire, England.  It contains 15 listed buildings that are recorded in the National Heritage List for England.  Of these, one is at Grade II*, the middle of the three grades, and the others are at Grade II, the lowest grade.  The parish contains the village of Culmington and smaller settlements, and is otherwise rural.  The listed buildings include houses and cottages, farmhouses, and farm buildings, the earliest of which are timber framed, a church and a headstone in the churchyard, a school, and two follies, one of which has been converted for residential use.


Key

Buildings

References

Citations

Sources

Lists of buildings and structures in Shropshire